Strigatella is a genus of sea snails, marine gastropod mollusks in the subfamily Strigatellinae of the family Mitridae.

Species
Species within the genus Strigatella include:

 Strigatella abacophora (Melvill, 1888)
 Strigatella amaura  (Hervier, 1897)
 Strigatella ambigua (Swainson, 1829)
 Strigatella assimilis (Pease, 1868)
 Strigatella aurantia (Gmelin, 1791)
 Strigatella auriculoides (Reeve, 1845)
 Strigatella aurora  (Dohrn, 1861)
 Strigatella coffea (Schubert & J. A. Wagner, 1829)
 Strigatella colombelliformis (Kiener, 1838)
 Strigatella coronadoensis F. Baker & Spicer, 1930
 Strigatella coronata  (Lamarck, 1811)
 Strigatella crassicostata (G. B. Sowerby II, 1874)
 Strigatella decurtata (Reeve, 1844)
 Strigatella fasciolaris (Deshayes, 1833)
 Strigatella flavocingulata (Lamy, 1938)
 Strigatella fulvescens (Broderip, 1836)
 Strigatella holkosa (Broderip, 1836)
 Strigatella imperialis (Röding, 1798)
 Strigatella litterata (Lamarck, 1811)
 Strigatella luctuosa (A. Adams, 1853)
 Strigatella lugubris (Swainson, 1821)
 Strigatella nana (Reeve, 1844)
 Strigatella obliqua (Lesson, 1842)
 Strigatella paupercula (Linnaeus, 1758)
 Strigatella pica (Dillwyn, 1817)
 Strigatella pudica (Dillwyn, 1817)
 Strigatella retusa (Lamarck, 1811)
 Strigatella scutulata (Gmelin, 1791)
 Strigatella subruppelli (Gmelin, 1791)
 Strigatella tabida  (Herrmann & R. Salisbury, 2013)
 Strigatella telescopium (Reeve, 1844)
 Strigatella testacea (Broderip, 1836)
 Strigatella ticaonica (Reeve, 1844)
 Strigatella tristis  (Broderip, 1836)
 Strigatella vexillum  (Reeve, 1844)
 Strigatella vultuosa (Reeve, 1844)
 Strigatella zebra (Lamarck, 1811)

Species brought into synonymy
 Strigatella acuminata (Swainson, 1824): synonym of Nebularia acuminata (Swainson, 1824)
 Strigatella bellula (A. Adams, 1853): synonym of Nebularia bellula (A. Adams, 1853)
 Strigatella brunnea Pease, 1868: synonym of Strigatella fastigium (Reeve, 1845): synonym of Nebularia fastigium (Reeve, 1845)
 Strigatella buryi (Melvill & Sykes, 1899): synonym of Mitra chrysalis Reeve, 1844: synonym of Pseudonebularia chrysalis (Reeve, 1844)
 Strigatella catalinae Dall, 1919: synonym of Atrimitra catalinae (Dall, 1919) (original combination)
 Strigatella chrysostoma (Broderip, 1836) : synonym of Nebularia chrysostoma (Broderip, 1836)
 Strigatella crassa (Swainson, 1822): synonym of Mitra aurantia (Gmelin, 1791): synonym of Strigatella aurantia (Gmelin, 1791)
 Strigatella fastigium (Reeve, 1845): synonym of Nebularia fastigium (Reeve, 1845)
 Strigatella georgi F. Nordsieck, 1975: synonym of Pusia zebrina (d'Orbigny, 1840) (synonym)
 Strigatella nigricans (Pease, 1865): synonym of Nebularia luctuosa (A. Adams, 1853): synonym of Strigatella luctuosa (A. Adams, 1853)
 Strigatella nitilina Spry, 1961: synonym of Mitra fastigium Reeve, 1845: synonym of Nebularia fastigium (Reeve, 1845)
 Strigatella oleacea (Reeve, 1844): synonym of Zierliana oleacea (Reeve, 1844): synonym of Vexillum oleacea (Reeve, 1844)
 Strigatella peculiaris (Reeve, 1845): synonym of Carinomitra peculiaris (Reeve, 1845)
 Strigatella pellisserpentis (Reeve, 1844): synonym of Nebularia pellisserpentis (Reeve, 1844)
 Strigatella picea Pease, 1860: synonym of Vexillum piceum (Pease, 1860) (original combination)
 Strigatella typha (Reeve, 1845): synonym of Carinomitra typha (Reeve, 1845)
 Strigatella virgata (Reeve, 1844): synonym of Strigatella retusa f. virgata (Reeve, 1844): synonym of Strigatella retusa (Lamarck, 1811)

The synonymized genus Chrysame contains the uncertain species Chrysame pertusa (Linnaeus, 1758) (nomen dubium).

References

 Fedosov A., Puillandre N., Herrmann M., Kantor Yu., Oliverio M., Dgebuadze P., Modica M.V. & Bouchet P. (2018). The collapse of Mitra: molecular systematics and morphology of the Mitridae (Gastropoda: Neogastropoda). Zoological Journal of the Linnean Society. 1-85

External links
 Swainson, W. (1840). A treatise on malacology or shells and shell-fish. London, Longman. viii + 419 pp.
 Adams, H. & Adams, A. (1853-1858). The genera of Recent Mollusca; arranged according to their organization. London, van Voorst.
 Martens, E. von. (1880). Mollusken. Pp. 179-353, pl. 19-22 In K. Möbius, F. Richters & E. von Martens, Beiträge zur Meeresfauna der Insel Mauritius und der Seychellen. Berlin: Gutmann

 
Mitridae
Gastropod genera